Ad is a first name. It is common in the Netherlands, where it is almost always short for Adrianus or Adriaan. In America it can be short for Adolph, Adam, Addison, and others. People with the first name of Ad include:

 Ad Achkar (born 1988), Lebanese photographer and artist
 Ad van der Avoird (born 1943), Dutch chemist
 Ad Bax (born 1956), Dutch-American biophysicist
 Ad de Boer (born 1946), Dutch politician
 Ad Brennan (1887–1962), American baseball pitcher
 Ad Carter (1895–1957), American cartoonist (Ad stands for "August Daniel")
 Ad Dekkers (1938–1974), Dutch artist
 Ad Dekkers (1953–2002), Dutch cyclist
 Ad Donker (1933–2002), Dutch-South African publisher
 Ad Geelhoed (1942–2007), Dutch professor, civil service worker, and Advocate-General
 Ad Gumbert (1868–1925), American baseball pitcher
 Ad Hermes (1929–2002), Dutch politician
 Ad Kaland (1922–1995), Dutch politician
 Ad Abi Karam (born 1937), Lebanese-Australian Catholic bishop
 Ad van Kempen (born 1944), Dutch actor
 Ad Kolnaar (born 1942), Dutch economist
 Ad Konings (born 1956), Dutch ichthyologist
 Ad Koppejan (born 1962), Dutch politician
 Ad Lagendijk (born 1947), Dutch physicist
 Ad Lankford (1882–1967), American baseball pitcher
 Ad van Liempt (born 1949), Dutch journalist
 Ad Liska (1906–1998), American baseball pitcher
 Ad van Luyn (born 1935), Dutch Roman Catholic bishop
 Ad Melkert (born 1956), Dutch politician
 Ad Moolhuijzen (born 1943), Dutch water polo player
 Ad Neeleman (born 1964), Dutch-British linguist
 Ad Reinhardt (1913–1967), American abstract painter
 Ad Rutschman (born 1931), American football and baseball coach
 Ad Santel (1887–1966), American professional wrestler
 Ad Simonis (1931–2020), Dutch Roman Catholic cardinal
 Ad Sluijter (born 1981), Dutch guitarist
 Ad Snijders (1929–2010), Dutch painter
 Ad van der Steur (1893–1953), Dutch architect
 Ad Stouthamer (born 1931), Dutch microbiologist
 Ad Swigler (1895–1975), American baseball pitcher
 Ad Tak (born 1953), Dutch bicycle racer
 Ad van Tiggelen (born 1958), Dutch banker and fantasy writer
 Ad Vandenberg (born 1954), Dutch rock guitarist
 Ad Visser (born 1947), Dutch VJ, presenter, writer, and music artist
 Ad Wammes (born 1953), Dutch composer
 Ad Wenke (1898–1961), American football player and justice
 Ad Wijnands (born 1959), Dutch bicycle racer
 Ad Wolgast (1888–1955), American boxer
 Ad Wouters (born 1944), Dutch-Belgian sculptor
 Ad Yale (1870–1948), American baseball player
 Ad Zonderland (1940–2007), Dutch football manager and administrator

References

Dutch masculine given names